Rada'a District is a district of the Al Bayda Governorate, Yemen. As of 2003, the district had a population of 56,382 inhabitants.

Climate

References

External links 

Districts of Al Bayda Governorate
Radda District